Lake Heights is a coastal suburb east of Berkeley and south of Cringila in the City of Wollongong.

The suburb gets its name from being above Lake Illawarra and most streets in the suburb enjoy views of the lake and escarpment.

Sport
The suburb's local Football (Soccer) club is Lake Heights Lions who are yet to have an official playing ground but train at Barina oval and occasionally play at John Crehan Park in Cringila.

References

Suburbs of Wollongong